OGRE is a science fiction board wargame designed by the American game designer Steve Jackson and published by Metagaming Concepts in 1977 as the first microgame in its MicroGame line. When Steve Jackson left Metagaming to form his own company, he took the rights to OGRE with him, and all subsequent editions have been produced by Steve Jackson Games (SJG).

Game description

OGRE is an asymmetrical two-player wargame set in the late 21st century that pits a single giant robot tank called an "OGRE" against the second player's headquarters, defended by a mixture of conventional tanks, infantry, and artillery.

The game components of the 1982 edition published by Steve Jackson Games are  a 14" x 9" map printed on glossy paper, counters representing military units and machines printed on sheets of cardboard (but not die-cut), and a 40-page rulebook. The hex map depicts a battleground of barren terrain with only ridgelines and large, radioactive craters as obstacles.

Setup
The defender sets up his forces in the more congested part of the map; the OGRE controlled by the other player enters the opposite side of the map at the beginning of the game.

Several scenarios are given. The basic version of the game has the attacker using a single OGRE heavy tank (referred to as a "Mark III OGRE"), while the advanced scenario gives the attacker the larger, more powerful "Mark V OGRE" tank versus an increased number of defenders. In either game, the defender is allocated a certain number of infantry and 'armor units', but gets to decide the exact composition of his own armored forces.

Movement
Each piece has a movement factor which indicates the number of hexes it can move each turn, although certain types of terrain can penalize this. Most units are restricted to "move & shoot" phases each turn (move phase first, then combat phase). There are two notable exceptions: GEVs can move both before and after combat, and the OGRE can ram into an enemy unit during its movement phase, possibly destroying the defender

Combat
Attacks are resolved by comparing the attacking unit's strength to the defending unit's defense strength. All units attacking the same unit can combine their attack factors. Likewise, the player of the OGRE can combine the attack factors of its different weapon systems if aimed at the same target. When defending, adjacent or stacked units are considered separate targets and cannot combine their defense factors. In the OGRE, each system is considered a separate target.

The ratio of attack to defense factors is looked up in a combat results table. For OGRE systems, either attacking or defending, there are only two outcomes: no effect, or destroyed. For infantry and armor units, there are three possible outcomes: no effect, disabled (armor units lose their next turn, and infantry units lose one strength point), or destroyed.

Strategy
The different types of units available to the defender encourage a combined-arms approach with each type being better than the others in different aspects. Heavy tanks have high attack and defense with moderate speed and low range. Missile tanks have moderate attack and defense with moderate range and low speed. G.E.V.s ("ground effect vehicles"—roughly, heavily armored hovercraft) have very high speed (moving twice per turn), low attack, low range, and moderate defense.  Howitzers have very high attack and range but are easily destroyed (once an attacker has managed to get close enough), immobile, and expensive. However, according to the game's designer, this balanced mix of units was not quite right in the first edition; the second edition sped up heavy tanks, slowed down G.E.V.s, and changed the defender's purchasing from "attack factors" to "armor units" (everything is considered equivalent, except howitzers, which are worth two of anything else).

Publication history
 In 1960, science fiction author Keith Laumer wrote Combat Unit, the first of many short stories and novellas about large, semi-intelligent tanks called "Bolos". These stories and Colin Kapp's short story "Gottlos" (1969) were major influences in the development of OGRE.

OGRE was designed by American game designer Steve Jackson and published by Metagaming Concepts in 1977 featuring artwork by Winchell Chung. The game proved popular, and Metagaming quickly released a second edition later the same year, with a much larger print run and rulebook artwork by Clark Bradly rather than Chung.

When Steve Jackson left Metagaming to found Steve Jackson Games (SJG), he took the rights to OGRE with him and published a new (third) edition in 1982. This third edition featured double-sided counters. SJG also created a sequel, G.E.V.

In 1987, SJG released OGRE: Deluxe Edition. The rulebook cover artwork was the Denis Loubet illustration that was also used for the OGRE computer game (see Spinoffs below). The board was sturdier than the previous edition's paper map, and the counters were provided with stand-up plastic bases.

In 1990, OGRE was combined with G.E.V. in an OGRE/G.E.V. box. The OGRE rules were designated as the 4th edition and the G.E.V. rules were designated as the 3rd edition. OGRE/G.E.V. was released into a single 5 3/8" x 8 1/2" box, and the rules were combined into a single 4" x 7" two-way booklet, with the rule for one game printed in one direction; the booklet was flipped over to see the other rules.

In 2000, OGRE/G.E.V. was released again and designated as the 5th edition, with new cover art by Phillip Reed, sold in a VHS box, but rules still in a 4" x 7", 44-page booklet and counters in black, red and white (2-sided).

A "new" Deluxe OGRE (2000) was a re-issued version of the original OGRE, packaged with miniatures rather than counters, and the original "crater" map printed on a larger scale.

In 2011 Steve Jackson announced a sixth edition, The OGRE Designer's Edition, combining OGRE and G.E.V. with larger full-color flat counters for most units and constructible cardboard figures for the Ogres.

In May 2012, a new Designer's Edition of OGRE was funded on Kickstarter.com.

In late 2018, SJG ran a Kickstarter for OGRE Battlefields, an update and expansion for both the Designer's Edition and the Sixth Edition.

In 2020, SJG released an updated pocket box version of OGRE with a 16-page manual and 112 counters, along with updated pocket box versions of G.E.V., Battlesuit, and Shockwave.

In 2021, as part of a Kickstarter campaign, SJG released 1976 OGRE Playtest Booklet, a reproduction of the original typewritten playtest set for the first version of OGRE.

Reception
In the April–June 1977 edition The Space Gamer (Issue No. 11), Robert C. Kirk concluded that the 1977 edition of "OGRE is attractive, easy to learn, inexpensive, and fun to play. What more can a gamer ask?" In the next edition of The Space Gamer, William A. Peterson commented that "It is fast, simple, and fun. Its bad points, while annoying, can be ignored."

In Issue 11 of Dragon, Tony Watson wrote, "The nice thing about OGRE is that after you’ve played a game there’s usually time for one more. Thus, you can rectify perceived flaws in your defense or experiment with a new mix or set-up immediately, while the new ideas are still fresh in your mind. Such experimentation is always interesting, and certainly the best way to learn good play." Seven issues later, Jerry Eperson called OGRE "one of those games that get their hook into you the minute you play them [...] But hidden in the game are small subtleties that can only be found after playing OGRE several times."

In the August–September 1977 edition of White Dwarf (Issue 2), Martin Easterbrook began his review of Metagaming Concepts' original 1977 edition by saying "Be warned: this game could become a craze" adding that "the idea of the microgames themselves is remarkable enough in itself". He gave the game an above-average rating of 8 out of 10 but criticized the game's title and "flimsy equipment, weak infantry".

In the inaugural edition of Ares (March 1980), David Ritchie gave the game a below-average rating of 6 out of 9, commenting,"The first of the MicroGames, OGRE started an avalanche of small, fast, playable games [...] A Panzer freak's ultimate dream."

In the 1980 book The Complete Book of Wargames, game designer Jon Freeman commented, "It is ridiculously inexpensive — almost disposable. Despite its size and price, it is well produced and reasonably presented." Freeman thought its best value, though, was in its gameplay: "Most significantly, it's an exceptionally fast and interesting game." He noted the game's drawbacks were minor and gave this game an Overall Evaluation of "Excellent", concluding, "It's one of the best values in gaming."

In Issue 30 of Phoenix (March–April 1981), Michael Stoner thought the counters of the original Metagaming Concepts edition were flimsy and sometimes difficult to read, but otherwise called OGRE "an excellent 'fun' game, taking less than an hour to play and easy to teach."

In the August 1982 edition of Dragon (Issue 64), Tony Watson reviewed the first reissue by Steve Jackson Games, and called OGRE "a legend in the ranks of SF gamedom, and deservedly so... as well as being a lot of fun to play, it's an interesting extrapolation on high-tech armored warfare". Watson noted that the rules had remained essentially the same in the new edition, the most significant changes being to the physical design—with larger (still black and white) counters, and full-color maps by Denis Loubet.  Watson also welcomed the retention of the original artwork alongside new pieces — "no one draws a GEV or OGRE like Mr. Chung". He concluded with a strong recommendation, saying it "would make a fine addition to any gamer's collection."

In the April 1989 edition of G.M. (Vol. 1, Issue 8), Johnny Razor reviewed OGRE: Deluxe Edition and highlighted the game's ease of introduction and short playing time, but pointed out that most gamers either like the game or loathe it.

In the August 1991 edition of Dragon (Issue 172), Allen Varney reviewed the combined OGRE/G.E.V. edition of 1991, and stated, "[The] two simulation board games of armored combat on a future battlefield are among the best the field has ever seen: fast, elegant, and endlessly replayable". While praising the production values of the 2-color playing pieces, Varney found the box somewhat 'flimsy'. He concluded, "These twin classics shouldn't be missed."

OGRE was chosen for inclusion in the 2007 book Hobby Games: The 100 Best. Game designer Erick Wujcik commented " I think [OGRE'''s] success really boils down to four essentials: OGRE is fast, ... asymmetrical, ... open-ended, ... [and] is a teaching tool.  OGRE had restructured my mind pretty completely ... but it wasn't until 2002 ... that I realized how effective OGRE is at getting across so many important component mechanisms of play and design [...] Gameplay summons to mind a futuristic nightmare of desperation and exhilaration, where rumbling machines unleash barrage after barrage of titanic weaponry and the inexorable advance of a soulless giant can only be stopped by zinging swarms of self-sacrificing martyrs."

In a retrospective review of Ogre in Black Gate, John ONeill said "When you sat down to play a game of Ogre, you weren't just pushing cheap cardboard counters across a piece of paper, and rolling a d6 you stole from your sister's Clue game. You were a participant in a mini theater of the imagination. The stakes were perilously high for your human defenders as they valiantly surged across the blasted landscape towards an unstoppable enemy of mankind, and almost certain death. Every game brought surprises, and the kind of high drama and excitement that kept you and your friends talking for days — or at least until the next time the board came out."

Spin-offsOGRE has generated several related spin-offs.

Video games
The video game Ogre was published in 1986 by Origin Systems, Inc. for Apple II, Amiga, Atari 8-bit, Atari ST, Commodore 64, DOS, and Macintosh,

A modern version of the game was released for PC, PlayStation 4, Nintendo Switch, and Xbox One in 2017, developed and published by Auroch Digital.

Board games
Other board games based on OGRE include:Diceland: OGRE, a paper dice game by Cheapass Games.
 Shockwave, an expansion that introduced new unit types including cruise missiles and a map that could be used with the G.E.V. map.

Miniatures and miniatures wargaming
Martian Metals produced the first set of OGRE miniatures under license from Metagaming Concepts in 1979.OGRE Miniatures, an adaptation of the game to miniature wargaming using 1:285 scale miniatures, was produced by SJG in 1991.

A set of OGRE miniatures was also developed by Ral Partha.

Role-playing gamesGURPS OGRE (2000) is a supplement using the rules system from the universal role-playing game GURPS.

BooksThe OGRE Book (1982) is a collection of articles and rules variants from The Space Gamer. It was reissued in 2001, and expanded from 40 pages to 128 with further retrospective from Steve Jackson.

Awards
Over the years, the game and its spin-offs have garnered several awards:

At the 1979 Origins Awards, OGRE miniatures produced by Martian Metals won the H.G. Wells Award for "Best Vehicular Model Series of 1978".

At the 1992 Origins Award, two OGRE-related products won awards:OGRE Miniatures, produced by SJG, was awarded Best Miniatures Rules of 1991.
A set of OGRE miniatures developed by Ral Partha won Best Vehicular Miniatures Series of 1991.

In 1996, Computer Gaming World named the 1986 video game OGRE produced by Origin Systems the 130th-best computer game ever released.

In 2001, 34 years after OGREs original publication, The Wargamer presented Steve Jackson Games with a special Award for Excellence for the "OGRE/G.E.V. game system and Steve Jackson Games' efforts to expand and support it."

Other reviews and commentaryDifferent Worlds No. 9 (Aug–Sept 1980)Fantastic Science Fiction v27 n11Isaac Asimov's Science Fiction MagazineThe Last Province No. 2 (Dec 1992)White Wolf No. 9 (1988) contains a review of OGRE: Deluxe EditionGames & Puzzles #69, 81Galileo''

References

External links
 
 
 OGRE Kickstarter Project page
 Steve Jackson Games' OGRE page
 Winchell Chung's page and his OGRE artwork

Board games introduced in 1977
Fiction about tanks
Kickstarter-funded tabletop games
Metagaming Concepts games
Science fiction board wargames
Steve Jackson (American game designer) games
Steve Jackson Games games
Wargames introduced in 1977